Elyptron cinctum is a moth in the family Noctuidae. It is found in Madagascar.

Saalmüller described this species as of brown colour with a wingspan of 23mm.

References
Saalmüller, Max & von Heyden, L., 1891, Lepidopteren von Madagascar. — :247–531, pls. 7–14

Moths described in 1891
Amphipyrinae
Moths of Madagascar
Moths of Africa